Anilara is a genus of beetles in the family Buprestidae, containing the following species:

 Anilara acutipennis Théry, 1911
 Anilara adelaidae (Hope, 1846)
 Anilara aeraria Carter, 1926
 Anilara angusta Blackburn, 1891
 Anilara anthaxoides Théry, 1911
 Anilara antiqua Théry, 1911
 Anilara balthasari Obenberger, 1928
 Anilara blackburni Obenberger, 1928
 Anilara chalcea Obenberger, 1928
 Anilara convexa Kerremans, 1898
 Anilara doddi Carter, 1928
 Anilara hoscheki Obenberger, 1916
 Anilara laeta Blackburn, 1891
 Anilara longicollis Théry, 1911
 Anilara mephisto Obenberger, 1928
 Anilara nigrita Kerremans, 1898
 Anilara obscura (Macleay, 1872)
 Anilara olivia Carter, 1926
 Anilara pagana (Obenberger, 1915)
 Anilara planifrons Blackburn, 1887
 Anilara purpurascens (Macleay, 1888)
 Anilara quieta Obenberger, 1928
 Anilara strandi Obenberger, 1928
 Anilara subcostata Blackburn, 1891
 Anilara subimpressa Carter, 1936
 Anilara sulcicollis Kerremans, 1898
 Anilara sulcipennis Kerremans, 1898
 Anilara tibialis Obenberger, 1928
 Anilara victoriae Obenberger, 1928
 Anilara viridula Kerremans, 1903

References

Buprestidae genera